Bob Campiglia (born April 21, 1941) is a former American football coach.

Coaching career
Campiglia was the head football coach for the Coast Guard Bears located in New London, Connecticut.  He held that position for three seasons, from 1983 until 1985. His coaching record at Coast Guard was 11 wins and 19 losses.

References

1941 births
Living people
Coast Guard Bears football coaches
Colorado State University alumni
Holy Cross Crusaders football coaches
Vanderbilt Commodores football coaches